Nathalia Novaes is a Brazilian model. She has worked with Marie Claire, Glamour and Vogue. She now has signed with various modelling agencies including Ford Models Brazil São Paulo, Next Models, Modelwerk Hamburg, Premier Model Management London, Why Not Model Management Milan and JAG Models New York.

References

Year of birth missing (living people)
Place of birth missing (living people)
Living people
Brazilian female models